Mora megistosperma is a species of rainforest tree in the subfamily Caesalpinioideae. It is found in Costa Rica, Panama Colombia and Ecuador. It grows 147 feet (45 meters) in height and up to thirteen feet (4 meters) diameter at breast height (D.B.H.). It is most noted for producing the largest seeds of any Dicot plant; up to 7 inches (18 cm) long by six inches (15 cm) wide. and up to four inches (ten cm) thick.

References

Caesalpinioideae